Christian Reinthaler (born 14 May 1975) is an Austrian former ski jumper.

References

Living people
Austrian male ski jumpers
Place of birth missing (living people)
1975 births
20th-century Austrian people